Aleksandr Sergeyevich Nevidimy (born 5 August 1988) is a Russian former professional football player.

Club career
He played in the Russian Football National League for FC Chernomorets Novorossiysk in 2008.

External links
 
 

1988 births
People from Novorossiysk
Living people
Russian footballers
Association football midfielders
FC Chernomorets Novorossiysk players
FC Spartak-UGP Anapa players
FC Sheksna Cherepovets players
FC Oryol players
FC Dynamo Stavropol players
Sportspeople from Krasnodar Krai